Jonathan Worsley (born 2 August 1984) is a Welsh darts player who currently competes in the PDC (professional darts corporation) .

He first gained a PDC Tour Card at Q-School in January 2016. Despite qualifying for the UK Open twice, he failed to retain his card at the end of his two-year spell on the ProTour. In early 2018, Worsley was unsuccessful at UK Q-School so played the PDC Challenge Tour - without much success until the latter part of the year where he made one quarter-final and also won event 18, beating Cody Harris in the final. Also in 2018, Worsley qualified for the BDO World Trophy, but lost to Kyle McKinstry in the last 32.

He returned to UK Q-School in January 2019 and was able to win back his card as three last 16 finishes on the first three days saw him finish 1st on the Order of Merit and seal a two-year Tour Card.

External links

Living people
Professional Darts Corporation former tour card holders
Welsh darts players
1984 births